Cyrtandra biflora is a species of flowering plant in the family Gesneriaceae, native to Tahiti. The first species collected in its genus, it was collected (and described) by Johann Reinhold Forster and his son Georg Forster, botanists on the second voyage of James Cook.

References

biflora
Flora of the Society Islands
Plants described in 1776
Taxa named by Johann Reinhold Forster
Taxa named by Georg Forster